André Jerônimo de Andrade or simply André (born January 25, 1983), is a Brazilian defensive midfielder. He currently plays for Villa Nova on loan from Cruzeiro until April 2008.

Contract
Villa Nova (Loan) 28 May 2007 to 30 April 2008
Cruzeiro 1 May 2007 to 30 April 2009

External links 
 villanovamg.br
 CBF

1983 births
Living people
Brazilian footballers
Cruzeiro Esporte Clube players
Association football midfielders
People from Carapicuíba
Footballers from São Paulo (state)